Christina Courtin (born 1984) is an American singer, violinist, and songwriter.

A performer from an early age and a graduate of the Juilliard School, Christina Courtin released her first, self-titled, album in June 2009 on Nonesuch Records, of which Patrick McKiernan of website allgigs.co.uk stated, "It's nothing short of immense how beautiful this girl's debut album is." She was featured on NPR's World Cafe in 2009. She performs regularly with The Knights, an ensemble founded by fellow Juilliard graduates, brothers Colin and Eric Jacobsen.

References

External links 
Official site
"The Next Somebody," in Time Out NY magazine, February 2006.
"Christina Courtin Releases New Self-titled Album" on top40-charts.com, June 2009
Album Review
Juilliard Q&A with Christina Courtin

1984 births
Living people
Juilliard School alumni
Singer-songwriters from New York (state)
Musicians from Buffalo, New York
21st-century American singers
21st-century American violinists